Yuyang may refer to the following places in China:

Yuyang District, a district in Yulin, Shaanxi
Yuyang Commandery, a historical region in North China
Yuayang Town (渔洋), a town in Qianjiang, Hubei
Yuyang Subdistrict (玉阳街道), a subdistrict in Dangyang, Hubei
Yuyang, postal romanization for Youyang Tujia and Miao Autonomous County, Chongqing

See also
Yu Yang (disambiguation)